Eupoca polyorma is a moth in the family Crambidae. It is found in Venezuela.

References

Moths described in 1936
Glaphyriinae